Camponotus sericeus is a species of carpenter ant (genus Camponotus) widely distributed in the Afrotropical and oriental regions.

Subspecies
Camponotus sericeus euchrous Santschi, 1926
Camponotus sericeus peguensis Emery, 1895
Camponotus sericeus sanguiniceps Donisthorpe, 1942
Camponotus sericeus sulgeri Santschi, 1913

References

External links

sericeus
Insects described in 1798
Taxa named by Johan Christian Fabricius